Liquirizia (Italian for "Liquorice") is a 1979 Italian teen comedy film written and directed by Salvatore Samperi and starring Christian De Sica , Barbara Bouchet,  Jenny Tamburi, Teo Teocoli and Tino Schirinzi.

Plot

Cast 
Christian De Sica as Gian Galeazzo Lo Cascio
Barbara Bouchet as Raffaella
Teo Teocoli as  Flyn
Jenny Tamburi as  Marina
Gigi Ballista as Mr. Bartolozzi
Tino Schirinzi as The Professor  
 Stefano Ruzzante as  Carletto
 Massimo Anzellotti as  Fulvio
Enzo Cannavale as  The custode
Eros Pagni as The barista 
Giancarlo Magalli as  Mimic
 Benedetta Fazzini as la figlia del sig. Bartolozzi
 Simona Mariani as Giulia
Carmen Russo as  Fulvio's Girlfriend
Enzo Liberti as  Fulvio's Father
Ricky Gianco as himself
Sandro Ghiani as A Student

See also    
 List of Italian films of 1979

References

External links

Italian teen comedy films
1970s teen comedy films
1979 comedy films
1979 films
Films directed by Salvatore Samperi
Titanus films
1970s Italian films